The Iraqi Turkmen Brotherhood Party is a political party in Iraq led by Walid Sharika. It is mostly made up of Iraqi Turkmen and is part of the Kurdistani Alliance.

Unlike the Iraqi Turkmen Front, it supports Kurdish moves to incorporate Kirkuk into Iraqi Kurdistan. Walid Sharika has distanced himself from fellow Turkmen politicians who insist that Kirkuk is a Turkmen city, reportedly characterizing some of them as "'spies and agents' of a foreign power". The party is believed by some to be a proxy of leading Kurdish parties.

References

Turkmen political parties in Iraq